The Château de Montpensier is a former castle in the commune of Montpensier in the Puy-de-Dôme département of France.

History
From the 11th century, Château de Montpensier was known as the fortress of Mons Pancherii (literally, Mont de la Panse, by reason of the shape of its motte). On 8 November 1226, King Louis VIII died there following a violent fever during his return from the Albigensian Crusade.

During the Hundred Years' War, the castle was still a strategic site that necessitated it being taken tower by tower by the English. Cardinal Richelieu ordered the destruction of the castle in 1633.

See also
List of castles in France

Sources
 Chronique de Guillaume de Nangis/Règne de Louis VIII (Édition J.-L.-J. Brière, Paris, 1825)
 Louis Bréhier: L'Auvergne (1912)
 Orientation table at the butte de Montpensier.

Ruined castles in Auvergne-Rhône-Alpes
Buildings and structures in Puy-de-Dôme